A knitting pattern is a set of written instructions on how to construct items using knitting.

Forms
There are two basic forms of knitting patterns:
 Text patterns which use numerals and words (and usually abbreviations), and
 Chart patterns which use symbols in a chart.

Some patterns include the entire instructions in both forms, as some knitters prefer one or the other.

Some patterns mix the forms to take advantage of the best of each. For example, a pattern's start and end may be described in text and a repeated design as a chart.

Each knitting pattern typically provides its own abbreviations and symbol keys or refers to a standard. There is no single authoritative source for knitting symbology and Knitting abbreviations, so multiple standards exist.

Both forms use the convention of sequential row numbers; a row counter is often used to keep track of progress through the pattern.

Text patterns
Text pattern details can vary from a general description to detailed stitch-by-stitch instruction. Knitting abbreviations are used for brevity.

Text patterns typically provide sequential instructions to be followed and may also include helpful advice.

Chart patterns
Chart patterns use a matrix of blocks filled with letters and symbols to describe the knitted stitches, typically with one stitch per block.

Chart patterns provide visual feedback on the relative position of stitches. They may be color-coded for multi-color knitting.

List of typical chart symbols
 : (blank) knit stitch (K) on right side; purl on wrong side
-: purl (P) on right side; knit on wrong side
o: yarn over (YO)
\: slip, slip, knit (ssk) on right side; slip, slip, purl (ssp) on wrong side
/: knit 2 together (k2tog) on right side; purl 2 together (p2tog) on wrong side
Sources:

Cables can be denoted by diagonal lines across multiple blocks to indicate number of stitches and direction of cable.

Other symbols unique to a particular pattern may be used.

Sources

Knitting patterns can be sold as a means of income. Knitting pattern collections are sold in books and magazines, but web sites such as Ravelry allow sale of individual knitting patterns.

The earliest known pattern book containing a knitting pattern was published in 1524. The earliest published English knitting pattern appeared in Natura Exenterata: or Nature Unbowelled, which was printed in London in 1655  Jane Gaugain was an early influential author of knitting pattern books in the early 1800s.

Yarn companies give away knitting patterns to promote use of their yarn.

See also
 Freeform crochet and knitting, to make a piece that is not constrained by patterns

References

Knitting tools and materials